Mons Penck is a mountain promontory on the near side of the Moon. It lies just to the northeast of the crater Kant, to the north of Ibn-Rushd and the Rupes Altai scarp. Southeast of Mons Penck are the prominent craters Theophilus and Cyrillus.

The selenographic coordinates of this peak are 10.0° S, 21.6° E. It has a diameter of about 30 km at the base and climbs to an altitude of over 4 km (13,000 feet). It was named after Albrecht Penck (1858–1945), a German geographer and geologist.

References

External links

 LTO-78C1 Kant — L&PI topographic orthophotomap map.

Penck, Mons